The New Zealand women's national ice hockey team, nicknamed the Ice Fernz, represents New Zealand at the International Ice Hockey Federation's IIHF World Women's Championships. The women's national team is controlled by New Zealand Ice Hockey Federation. As of 2011, New Zealand has 110 female players. The New Zealand women's national team is ranked 25th in the world. The Ice Fernz name is one of many national team nicknames (indirectly) related to the All Blacks and/or the New Zealand silver tree fern.

Tournament record

Olympic Games
New Zealand hockey team has never qualified for an Olympic tournament.

World Championship

The New Zealand women team participates in the world championship since 2005. At its first three participations of world championship, the New Zealanders finished every time the second or the third place of the division IV.

2005 – Finished in 29th place (2nd in Division IV)
2007 – Finished in 29th place (3rd in Division IV)
2008 – Finished in 28th place (2nd in Division IV)
2009 – Division IV cancelled
2011 – Finished in 26th place (1st in Division IV, Promoted to Division III).
2012 – Finished in 24th place (4th in Division IIA)
2013 – Finished in 24th place (4th in Division IIA)
2014 – Finished in 25th place (5th in Division IIA)
2015 – Finished in 26th place (6th in Division IIA, relegated to Division IIB)
2016 – Finished in 31st place (5th in Division IIB)
2017 – Finished in 28th place (3rd in Division IIB)
2018 – Finished in 31st place (4th in Division IIB)
2019 – Finished in 30th place (2nd in Division IIB)
2020 – Finished in 31st place (3rd in Division IIB)
2021 – Cancelled due to the COVID-19 pandemic
2022 – Withdrawn
2023 – Finished in 31st place (3rd in Division IIB)

Team
Roster for the 2023 IIHF Women's World Championship.

Head coach:  Geoffroy Boehme

<noinclude>

All-time Record against other nations
As of 3 April 2019

All-time record against other clubs
As of 3 April 2019

References

External links

IIHF profile

 
Ice hockey teams in New Zealand
Women's national ice hockey teams